Pingasa manilensis is a moth of the family Geometridae first described by Louis Beethoven Prout in 1916. It is found on the Philippines.

References

Pseudoterpnini
Endemic fauna of the Philippines
Fauna of Luzon
Moths of the Philippines
Moths described in 1916
Taxa named by Louis Beethoven Prout